Maksym Malyshev (born 24 December 1992) is a Ukrainian football midfielder.

Career
After playing for the Shakhtar Donetsk reserves and FC Shakhtar-3 Donetsk, in February 2013 he joined FC Zorya Luhansk on loan and made his debut in the Ukrainian Premier League. The following year, 2014–15, Malyshev continued to play on loan at Zorya and gained a lot more top flight experience in the process. He started most of their league games (playing over 1400 minutes) and scored three goals.

He made his Shakhtar debut on 19 July 2015 by playing the whole game in the Miners' 2015–16 season opener against Oleksandriya.

May 8, 2016 for the first time brought the Donetsk "Shakhtar" with the captain's armband for the match against the 25th round of UPL " Karpaty" . Rated Donetsk team captain Darijo Srna missed the match due to injury. Malyshev only in the current season debuted in the first team , held at that time as part of Shakhtar 31 matches, scoring four goals and made four assists.

International career

In June 2015, he took part in the national team of Ukraine in the World Youth Championship in New Zealand.

Honours

Club
Shakhtar
Ukrainian Premier League: 2016–17, 2017–18, 2018–19
Ukrainian Cup: 2015–16, 2016–17, 2017–18, 2018–19
Ukrainian Super Cup: 2015, 2017

Career statistics

Club

International

References

External links

Ukrainian footballers
FC Shakhtar Donetsk players
FC Shakhtar-3 Donetsk players
FC Zorya Luhansk players
Ukrainian Premier League players
Association football defenders
1992 births
Living people
Ukraine international footballers
Ukraine under-21 international footballers
Ukrainian Second League players
Footballers from Donetsk